The IAV Stryker family is a series of eight-wheeled all-wheel-drive armored combat vehicles.

Stryker may also refer to:

People with the surname
Homer Stryker (1894–1980), American orthopedic surgeon, and founder of Stryker Corporation
Jeff Stryker (born 1962), American porn star
Jon Stryker  (born c. 1958), American architect, philanthropist and activist
Matt Stryker (born 1979), ring name of wrestler Brian Woermann
M. Woolsey Stryker (1851–1929), American clergyman
Michael Stryker (born 1947), American neuroscientist
Robert F. Stryker (1944–1967), Medal of Honor, Vietnam War
Ronda Stryker (born 1954), American billionaire heiress
Roy Stryker, (1893–1975) managed documentary photography projects during the Great Depression for the U.S. government
S. Kellogg Stryker (1902–1989), of New York City
Stuart S. Stryker (died 1945), received the Medal of Honor for his actions during World War II 
Susan Stryker (born 1961), American professor, author, filmmaker, and theorist of gender and sexuality
Stryker (DJ) (Theodore Ramón Stryker) (born 1971), American disc jockey
Tim Stryker (born 1953), founder Galacticomm, makers of MajorBBS

Fictional
John Stryker, a character from the Stryker's Run and Codename: Droid video games
Kurtis Stryker, a character from the Mortal Kombat fighting game series
William Stryker, a Marvel comics villain, father of Jason Stryker
Jason Stryker, a Marvel comics villain, son of William Stryker

People with the given name
Stryker McGuire, an American journalist

Other
Stryker (Farscape), a fictional spacecraft in Farscape
Stryker (1983 film), a Filipino film
Stryker (2004 film), a Canadian film
Stryker, Ohio, a village in Williams County, Ohio, United States

See also
Stryker Corporation, a manufacturer of medical and orthopedic products.
Strykers bowl, an entertainment centre in Tamworth, Staffordshire
Stryker's Run, a video game published in 1986.
Striker (disambiguation)